Francis Walsall was a priest in England during the 17th Century.

Walsall was educated at Corpus Christi College, Cambridge, and was incorporated at Oxford in 1642. He held livings at Great Wigborough and Sandy. He was Archdeacon of Coventry from 1642  to 1661; and Prebendary of Westminster from 1660 to 1661.

Westminster Abbey
Alumni of Corpus Christi College, Cambridge